The U.S. state of Washington has six telephone area codes. The state initially used a single area code (206) until it was divided in 1957 with the creation of area code 509 to serve Eastern Washington. In 1995, 206 was split again to serve just the Puget Sound region after area code 360 was created to cover the remainder of Western Washington. In 1997, area code 425 was created from Seattle's Eastside and South Snohomish County suburbs and area code 253 for the Tacoma area, leaving 206 to cover just the city of Seattle, closely neighboring cities in King and Snohomish counties, and Bainbridge Island in Kitsap County.

See also

List of North American Numbering Plan area codes

References

External links
NANPA Washington area code map 

 
Washington
Area codes